Pi Kappa Delta is a Forensics (Public Speaking and Debate) Honor Society for undergraduate university students and a professional organization for graduates, typically university Speech and Debate Coaches.

Pi Kappa Delta, or PKD, encourages the education of articulate citizens through a three part focus:  the commitment to and promotion of ethical, humane and inclusive communication and educational practices; the commitment to and promotion of professional development of forensics educators; and the commitment to and promotion of comprehensive forensics programming.  More than 60,000 men and women have been initiated into PKD. Active chapters are located on more than 200 college and university campuses. Schools in PKD range in size from some of the largest universities to some of the smaller liberal arts colleges, teaching colleges, and church related colleges.

Programs and Initiatives

National Convention

PKD sponsors a National Convention every other year at which time the business of the organization is conducted along with an annual national tournament in individual events and debate. Competition is open to all undergraduate students who are members of PKD. Competitors who place highly enough in competition at this tournament earn points toward qualifying for the American Forensic Association National Individual Events Tournament and competing for a national championship.  This tournament can justifiably be considered a "team" tournament because both individual events and debate points add up to create the final sweepstakes total for a school. Quite often, PKD sponsors experimental events at the National Tournament.

Journal

PKD publishes a refereed journal entitled The Forensic of Pi Kappa Delta.  This journal is the oldest national forensic journal and has been a leader in pedagogical forensic research throughout its history. A cross-section of articles would include topics ranging from debate to individual events to philosophical issues related to competition and forensic education.  The Forensic accepts submissions from all members of the forensic community.

National Communication Association Convention

PKD sponsors and co-sponsors programs at the annual National Communication Association convention. In addition, a variety of awards are presented on an annual basis. These include the Pi Kappa Delta Hall of Fame, the L.E. Norton Award for Outstanding Scholarship, the John Shields Award for Outstanding Contributions to Pi Kappa Delta, the E.R. Nichols Award for Outstanding Contributions to Furtherance of the Forensic Discipline, the R. David Ray Award for Outstanding New PKD Chapter, the Carolyn Keefe Award for Outstanding Alumni, and the Bob Derryberry Award for Outstanding New Forensic Educator.

Symbols and traditions 
The colors of the Fraternity are Cardinal red and White.  However, when used for academic cords or stoles, Cardinal red and Slate grey are substituted.

The flower of the Fraternity is the Yellow Daffodil.

External links
ΠΚΔ National website

Honor societies
Student organizations established in 1913
1913 establishments in Kansas
Public speaking competitions
Public speaking organizations